A central bank, reserve bank, or monetary authority is an institution that manages the currency and monetary policy of a country or monetary union,
and oversees their commercial banking system. In contrast to a commercial bank, a central bank possesses a monopoly on increasing the monetary base. Most central banks also have supervisory and regulatory powers to ensure the stability of member institutions, to prevent bank runs, and to discourage reckless or fraudulent behavior by member banks.

Central banks in most developed nations are institutionally independent from political interference. Still, limited control by the executive and legislative bodies exists.

Issues like central bank independence, central bank policies and rhetoric in central bank governors discourse or the premises of macroeconomic policies (monetary and fiscal policy) of the state are a focus of contention and criticism by some policymakers, researchers and specialized business, economics and finance media.

Activities of central banks

Functions of a central bank usually include:

 Monetary policy: by setting the official interest rate and controlling the money supply;
Financial stability: acting as a government's banker and as the bankers' bank ("lender of last resort");
 Reserve management: managing a country's foreign-exchange and gold reserves and government bonds;
 Banking supervision: regulating and supervising the banking industry;
Payments system: managing or supervising means of payments and inter-banking clearing systems;
Coins and notes issuance;
Other functions of central banks may include economic research, statistical collection, supervision of deposit guarantee schemes, advice to government in financial policy.

Monetary policy
Central banks implement a country's chosen monetary policy.

Currency issuance
At the most basic level, monetary policy involves establishing what form of currency the country may have, whether a fiat currency, gold-backed currency (disallowed for countries in the International Monetary Fund), currency board or a currency union. When a country has its own national currency, this involves the issue of some form of standardized currency, which is essentially a form of promissory note: "money" under certain circumstances. Historically, this was often a promise to exchange the money for precious metals in some fixed amount. Now, when many currencies are fiat money, the "promise to pay" consists of the promise to accept that currency to pay for taxes.

A central bank may use another country's currency either directly in a currency union, or indirectly on a currency board. In the latter case, exemplified by the Bulgarian National Bank, Hong Kong and Latvia (until 2014), the local currency is backed at a fixed rate by the central bank's holdings of a foreign currency.
Similar to commercial banks, central banks hold assets (government bonds, foreign exchange, gold, and other financial assets) and incur liabilities (currency outstanding). Central banks create money by issuing banknotes and loaning them to the government in exchange for interest-bearing assets such as government bonds. When central banks decide to increase the money supply by an amount which is greater than the amount their national governments decide to borrow, the central banks may purchase private bonds or assets denominated in foreign currencies.

The European Central Bank remits its interest income to the central banks of the member countries of the European Union. The US Federal Reserve remits most of its profits to the U.S. Treasury. This income, derived from the power to issue currency, is referred to as seigniorage, and usually belongs to the national government. The state-sanctioned power to create currency is called the Right of Issuance. Throughout history, there have been disagreements over this power, since whoever controls the creation of currency controls the seigniorage income.
The expression "monetary policy" may also refer more narrowly to the interest-rate targets and other active measures undertaken by the monetary authority.

Goals of central banks

Price stability 
The primary role of central banks is usually to maintain price stability, as defined as a specific level of inflation. Inflation is defined either as the devaluation of a currency or equivalently the rise of prices relative to a currency. Most central banks currently have an inflation target close to 2%.

Since inflation lowers real wages, Keynesians view inflation as the solution to involuntary unemployment. However, "unanticipated" inflation leads to lender losses as the real interest rate will be lower than expected. Thus, Keynesian monetary policy aims for a steady rate of inflation. A publication from the Austrian School, The Case Against the Fed, argues that the efforts of the central banks to control inflation have been counterproductive.

Central banks as monetary authorities in representative states are intertwined through globalized financial markets. As a regulator of one of the most widespread currencies in the global economy,  Federal Reserve (FED) plays a huge role in the international monetary market. Being the main supplier and rate adjusted for USD, FED implements a certain set of requirements to regulate inflation and unemployment in the US, willingly or unwillingly influencing the actions of Central Bank of Armenia (CBA). Armenia is a small country with a relatively weak economy and bears the consequences of FED policies the most.

High employment 
Frictional unemployment is the time period between jobs when a worker is searching for, or transitioning from one job to another. Unemployment beyond frictional unemployment is classified as unintended unemployment.

For example, structural unemployment is a form of unemployment resulting from a mismatch between demand in the labour market and the skills and locations of the workers seeking employment. Macroeconomic policy generally aims to reduce unintended unemployment.

Keynes labeled any jobs that would be created by a rise in wage-goods (i.e., a decrease in real-wages) as involuntary unemployment:

Men are involuntarily unemployed if, in the event of a small rise in the price of wage-goods relatively to the money-wage, both the aggregate supply of labour willing to work for the current money-wage and the aggregate demand for it at that wage would be greater than the existing volume of employment.— John Maynard Keynes, The General Theory of Employment, Interest and Money p1

Economic growth
Economic growth can be enhanced by investment in capital, such as more or better machinery. A low interest rate implies that firms can borrow money to invest in their capital stock and pay less interest for it. Lowering the interest is therefore considered to encourage economic growth and is often used to alleviate times of low economic growth. On the other hand, raising the interest rate is often used in times of high economic growth as a contra-cyclical device to keep the economy from overheating and avoid market bubbles.

Further goals of monetary policy are stability of interest rates, of the financial market, and of the foreign exchange market.
Goals frequently cannot be separated from each other and often conflict. Costs must therefore be carefully weighed before policy implementation.

Climate change 
In the aftermath of the Paris agreement on climate change, a debate is now underway on whether central banks should also pursue environmental goals as part of their activities. In 2017, eight central banks formed the Network for Greening the Financial System (NGFS) to evaluate the way in which central banks can use their regulatory and monetary policy tools to support climate change mitigation. Today more than 70 central banks are part of the NGFS.

In January 2020, the European Central Bank has announced it will consider climate considerations when reviewing its monetary policy framework.

Proponents of "green monetary policy" are proposing that central banks include climate-related criteria in their collateral eligibility frameworks, when conducting asset purchases and also in their refinancing operations. But critics such as Jens Weidmann are arguing it is not central banks' role to conduct climate policy. China is among the most advanced central banks when it comes to green monetary policy. It has given green bonds preferential status to lower their yield and uses window policy to direct green lending.

Monetary policy instruments

The primary tools available to central banks are open market operations (including repurchase agreements), reserve requirements, interest rate policy (through control of the discount rate), and control of the money supply.

A central bank affects the monetary base through open market operations, if its country has a well developed market for its government bonds. This entails managing the quantity of money in circulation through the buying and selling of various financial instruments, such as treasury bills, repurchase agreements or "repos", company bonds, or foreign currencies, in exchange for money on deposit at the central bank. Those deposits are convertible to currency, so all of these purchases or sales result in more or less base currency entering or leaving market circulation. For example, if the central bank wishes to decrease interest rates (executing expansionary monetary policy), it purchases government debt, thereby increasing the amount of cash in circulation or crediting banks' reserve accounts. Commercial banks then have more money to lend, so they reduce lending rates, making loans less expensive. Cheaper credit card interest rates increase consumer spending. Additionally, when business loans are more affordable, companies can expand to keep up with consumer demand. They ultimately hire more workers, whose incomes increase, which in its turn also increases the demand. This method is usually enough to stimulate demand and drive economic growth to a healthy rate. Usually, the short-term goal of open market operations is to achieve a specific short-term interest rate target. In other instances, monetary policy might instead entail the targeting of a specific exchange rate relative to some foreign currency or else relative to gold. For example, in the case of the United States the Federal Reserve targets the federal funds rate, the rate at which member banks lend to one another overnight; however, the monetary policy of China (since 2014) is to target the exchange rate between the Chinese renminbi and a basket of foreign currencies.

If the open market operations do not lead to the desired effects, a second tool can be used: the central bank can increase or decrease the interest rate it charges on discounts or overdrafts (loans from the central bank to commercial banks, see discount window). If the interest rate on such transactions is sufficiently low, commercial banks can borrow from the central bank to meet reserve requirements and use the additional liquidity to expand their balance sheets, increasing the credit available to the economy.

A third alternative is to change the reserve requirements. The reserve requirement refers to the proportion of total liabilities that banks must keep on hand overnight, either in its vaults or at the central bank. Banks only maintain a small portion of their assets as cash available for immediate withdrawal; the rest is invested in illiquid assets like mortgages and loans. Lowering the reserve requirement frees up funds for banks to increase loans or buy other profitable assets. This is expansionary because it creates credit. However, even though this tool immediately increases liquidity, central banks rarely change the reserve requirement because doing so frequently adds uncertainty to banks' planning. The use of open market operations is therefore preferred.

Unconventional monetary policy 
Other forms of monetary policy, particularly used when interest rates are at or near 0% and there are concerns about deflation or deflation is occurring, are referred to as unconventional monetary policy. These include credit easing, quantitative easing, forward guidance, and signalling. In credit easing, a central bank purchases private sector assets to improve liquidity and improve access to credit. Signaling can be used to lower market expectations for lower interest rates in the future. For example, during the credit crisis of 2008, the US Federal Reserve indicated rates would be low for an "extended period", and the Bank of Canada made a "conditional commitment" to keep rates at the lower bound of 25 basis points (0.25%) until the end of the second quarter of 2010.

Some have envisaged the use of what Milton Friedman once called "helicopter money" whereby the central bank would make direct transfers to citizens in order to lift inflation up to the central bank's intended target. Such policy option could be particularly effective at the zero lower bound.

Banking supervision and other activities 

In some countries a central bank, through its subsidiaries, controls and monitors the banking sector. In other countries banking supervision is carried out by a government department such as the UK Treasury, or by an independent government agency, for example, UK's Financial Conduct Authority. It examines the banks' balance sheets and behaviour and policies toward consumers. Apart from refinancing, it also provides banks with services such as transfer of funds, bank notes and coins or foreign currency. Thus it is often described as the "bank of banks".

Many countries will monitor and control the banking sector through several different agencies and for different purposes. The Bank regulation in the United States for example is highly fragmented with 3 federal agencies, the Federal Deposit Insurance Corporation, the Federal Reserve Board, or Office of the Comptroller of the Currency and numerous others on the state and the private level. There is usually significant cooperation between the agencies. For example, money center banks, deposit-taking institutions, and other types of financial institutions may be subject to different (and occasionally overlapping) regulation. Some types of banking regulation may be delegated to other levels of government, such as state or provincial governments.

Any cartel of banks is particularly closely watched and controlled. Most countries control bank mergers and are wary of concentration in this industry due to the danger of groupthink and runaway lending bubbles based on a single point of failure, the credit culture of the few large banks.

Independence

Numerous governments have opted to make central banks independent. The economic logic behind central bank independence is that when governments delegate monetary policy to an independent central bank (with an anti-inflationary purpose) and away from elected politicians, monetary policy will not reflect the interests of the politicians. When governments control monetary policy, politicians may be tempted to boost economic activity in advance of an election to the detriment of the long-term health of the economy and the country. As a consequence, financial markets may not consider future commitments to low inflation to be credible when monetary policy is in the hands of elected officials, which increases the risk of capital flight. An alternative to central bank independence is to have fixed exchange rate regimes.

Governments generally have some degree of influence over even "independent" central banks; the aim of independence is primarily to prevent short-term interference. In 1951, the Deutsche Bundesbank became the first central bank to be given full independence, leading this form of central bank to be referred to as the "Bundesbank model", as opposed, for instance, to the New Zealand model, which has a goal (i.e. inflation target) set by the government.

Central bank independence is usually guaranteed by legislation and the institutional framework governing the bank's relationship with elected officials, particularly the minister of finance. Central bank legislation will enshrine specific procedures for selecting and appointing the head of the central bank. Often the minister of finance will appoint the governor in consultation with the central bank's board and its incumbent governor. In addition, the legislation will specify banks governor's term of appointment. The most independent central banks enjoy a fixed non-renewable term for the governor in order to eliminate pressure on the governor to please the government in the hope of being re-appointed for a second term. Generally, independent central banks enjoy both goal and instrument independence.

Despite their independence, central banks are usually accountable at some level to government officials, either to the finance ministry or to parliament. For example, the Board of Governors of the U.S. Federal Reserve are nominated by the U.S. president and confirmed by the Senate, publishes verbatim transcripts, and balance sheets are audited by the Government Accountability Office.

In the 1990s there was a trend towards increasing the independence of central banks as a way of improving long-term economic performance. While a large volume of economic research has been done to define the relationship between central bank independence and economic performance, the results are ambiguous.

The literature on central bank independence has defined a cumulative and complementary number of aspects:
 Institutional independence: The independence of the central bank is enshrined in law and shields central banks from political interference. In general terms, institutional independence means that politicians should refrain from seeking to influence monetary policy decisions, while symmetrically central banks should also avoid influencing government politics.
 Goal independence: The central bank has the right to set its own policy goals, whether inflation targeting, control of the money supply, or maintaining a fixed exchange rate. While this type of independence is more common, many central banks prefer to announce their policy goals in partnership with the appropriate government departments. This increases the transparency of the policy-setting process and thereby increases the credibility of the goals chosen by providing assurance that they will not be changed without notice. In addition, the setting of common goals by the central bank and the government helps to avoid situations where monetary and fiscal policy are in conflict; a policy combination that is clearly sub-optimal.
 Functional & operational independence: The central bank has the independence to determine the best way of achieving its policy goals, including the types of instruments used and the timing of their use. To achieve its mandate, the central bank has the authority to run its own operations (appointing staff, setting budgets, and so on.) and to organize its internal structures without excessive involvement of the government. This is the most common form of central bank independence. The granting of independence to the Bank of England in 1997 was, in fact, the granting of operational independence; the inflation target continued to be announced in the Chancellor's annual budget speech to Parliament.
 Personal independence: The other forms of independence are not possible unless central bank heads have a high security of tenure. In practice, this means that governors should hold long mandates (at least longer than the electoral cycle) and a certain degree of legal immunity. One of the most common statistical indicators used in the literature as a proxy for central bank independence is the "turn-over-rate" of central bank governors. If a government is in the habit of appointing and replacing the governor frequently, it clearly has the capacity to micro-manage the central bank through its choice of governors.
 Financial independence: central banks have full autonomy on their budget, and some are even prohibited from financing governments. This is meant to remove incentives from politicians to influence central banks.
 Legal independence : some central banks have their own legal personality, which allows them to ratify international agreements without the government's approval (like the ECB), and to go to court.

There is very strong consensus among economists that an independent central bank can run a more credible monetary policy, making market expectations more responsive to signals from the central bank. Both the Bank of England (1997) and the European Central Bank have been made independent and follow a set of published inflation targets so that markets know what to expect. Even the People's Bank of China has been accorded great latitude, though in China the official role of the bank remains that of a national bank rather than a central bank, underlined by the official refusal to "unpeg" the yuan or to revalue it "under pressure". The fact that the Communist Party is not elected also relieves the pressure to please people, increasing its independence.

International organizations such as the World Bank, the Bank for International Settlements (BIS) and the International Monetary Fund (IMF) strongly support central bank independence. This results, in part, from a belief in the intrinsic merits of increased independence. The support for independence from the international organizations also derives partly from the connection between increased independence for the central bank and increased transparency in the policy-making process. The IMF's Financial Services Action Plan (FSAP) review self-assessment, for example, includes a number of questions about central bank independence in the transparency section. An independent central bank will score higher in the review than one that is not independent.

Central bank independence indices 
Central bank independence indices allow a quantitative analysis of central bank independence for individual countries over time. One central bank independence index is the Garriga CBI, where an higher index indicates higher central bank independence, shown below for individual countries.

History

Early history

The use of money as a unit of account predates history. Government control of money is documented in the ancient Egyptian economy (2750–2150 BCE). The Egyptians measured the value of goods with a central unit called shat. Like many other currencies, the shat was linked to gold. The value of a shat in terms of goods was defined by government administrations. Other cultures in Asia Minor later materialized their currencies in the form of gold and silver coins.

In the medieval and the early modern period a network of professional banks was established in Southern and Central Europe. The institutes built a new tier in the financial economy. The monetary system was still controlled by government institutions, mainly through the coinage prerogative. Banks, however, could use book money to create deposits for their customers. Thus, they had the possibility to issue, lend and transfer money autonomously without direct governmental control.

In order to consolidate the monetary system, a network of public exchange banks was established at the beginning of the 17th century in main European trade centres. The Amsterdam Wisselbank was founded as a first institute in 1609. Further exchange banks were located in Hamburg, Venice and Nuremberg. The institutes offered a public infrastructure for cashless international payments. They aimed to increase the efficiency of international trade and to safeguard monetary stability. The exchange banks thus fulfilled comparable functions to modern central banks. The institutes even issued their own (book) currency, called Mark Banco.

The Bank of Amsterdam established in 1609 is considered to be the precursor to modern central banks. The central bank of Sweden ("Sveriges Riksbank" or simply "Riksbanken") was founded in Stockholm from the remains of the failed bank Stockholms Banco in 1664 and answered to the parliament ("Riksdag of the Estates"). One role of the Swedish central bank was lending money to the government.

Bank of England

The establishment of the Bank of England, the model on which most modern central banks have been based, was devised by Charles Montagu, 1st Earl of Halifax, in 1694, following a proposal by the banker William Paterson three years earlier, which had not been acted upon. In the Kingdom of England in the 1690s, public funds were in short supply, and the credit of William III's government was so low in London that it was impossible for it to borrow the £1,200,000 (at 8 percent) needed to finance the ongoing Nine Years' War with France. In order to induce subscription to the loan, Montagu proposed that the subscribers were to be incorporated as The Governor and Company of the Bank of England with long-term banking privileges including the issue of notes. The lenders would give the government cash (bullion) and also issue notes against the government bonds, which could be lent again. A royal charter was granted on 27 July through the passage of the Tonnage Act 1694. The bank was given exclusive possession of the government's balances, and was the only limited-liability corporation allowed to issue banknotes. The £1.2 million was raised in 12 days; half of this was used to rebuild the navy.

Although this establishment of the Bank of England marks the origin of central banking, it did not have the functions of a modern central bank, namely, to regulate the value of the national currency, to finance the government, to be the sole authorized distributor of banknotes, and to function as a 'lender of last resort' to banks suffering a liquidity crisis. These modern central banking functions evolved slowly through the 18th and 19th centuries.

Although the bank was originally a private institution, by the end of the 18th century it was increasingly being regarded as a public authority with civic responsibility toward the upkeep of a healthy financial system. The currency crisis of 1797, caused by panicked depositors withdrawing from the bank led to the government suspending convertibility of notes into specie payment. The bank was soon accused by the bullionists of causing the exchange rate to fall from over issuing banknotes, a charge which the bank denied. Nevertheless, it was clear that the bank was being treated as an organ of the state.

Henry Thornton, a merchant banker and monetary theorist has been described as the father of the modern central bank. An opponent of the real bills doctrine, he was a defender of the bullionist position and a significant figure in monetary theory. Thornton's process of monetary expansion anticipated the theories of Knut Wicksell regarding the "cumulative process which restates the Quantity Theory in a theoretically coherent form". As a response to the 1797 currency crisis, Thornton wrote in 1802 An Enquiry into the Nature and Effects of the Paper Credit of Great Britain, in which he argued that the increase in paper credit did not cause the crisis. The book also gives a detailed account of the British monetary system as well as a detailed examination of the ways in which the Bank of England should act to counteract fluctuations in the value of the pound.

Until the mid-nineteenth century, commercial banks were able to issue their own banknotes, and notes issued by provincial banking companies were commonly in circulation. Many consider the origins of the central bank to lie with the passage of the Bank Charter Act 1844. Under the 1844 Act, bullionism was institutionalized in Britain, creating a ratio between the gold reserves held by the Bank of England and the notes that the bank could issue. The Act also placed strict curbs on the issuance of notes by the country banks.

The bank accepted the role of 'lender of last resort' in the 1870s after criticism of its lacklustre response to the Overend-Gurney crisis. The journalist Walter Bagehot wrote on the subject in Lombard Street: A Description of the Money Market, in which he advocated for the bank to officially become a lender of last resort during a credit crunch, sometimes referred to as "Bagehot's dictum". Paul Tucker phrased the dictum in 2009 as follows:

Spread around the world

Central banks were established in many European countries during the 19th century. Napoleon created the Banque de France in 1800, in an attempt to improve the financing of his wars.
On the continent of Europe, the Bank of France remained the most important central bank throughout the 19th century. The Bank of Finland was founded in 1812, soon after Finland had been taken over from Sweden by Russia to become its grand duchy. A central banking role was played by a small group of powerful family banking houses, typified by the House of Rothschild, with branches in major cities across Europe, as well as the Hottinguer family in Switzerland and the Oppenheim family in Germany.

Although central banks today are generally associated with fiat money, the 19th and early 20th centuries central banks in most of Europe and Japan developed under the international gold standard. Free banking or currency boards were common at this time. Problems with collapses of banks during downturns, however, led to wider support for central banks in those nations which did not as yet possess them, most notably in Australia.

Australia established its first central bank in 1920, Peru in 1922, Colombia in 1923, Mexico and Chile in 1925 and Canada, India and New Zealand in the aftermath of the Great Depression in 1934. By 1935, the only significant independent nation that did not possess a central bank was Brazil, which subsequently developed a precursor thereto in 1945 and the present Central Bank of Brazil twenty years later. After gaining independence, African and Asian countries also established central banks or monetary unions. The Reserve Bank of India, which had been established during British colonial rule as a private company, was nationalized in 1949 following India's independence. The Central Bank of Armenia was founded on April 27, 1993 and the National Bank of Armenia was renamed into the Central Bank of the Republic of Armenia. It was under the governorship of Isahak Isahakyan who was governing the State Bank since 1986.

The People's Bank of China evolved its role as a central bank starting in about 1979 with the introduction of market reforms, which accelerated in 1989 when the country adopted a generally capitalist approach to its export economy. Evolving further partly in response to the European Central Bank, the People's Bank of China had by 2000 become a modern central bank. The most recent bank model was introduced together with the euro, and involves coordination of the European national banks, which continue to manage their respective economies separately in all respects other than currency exchange and base interest rates.

United States

Alexander Hamilton as Secretary of the Treasury in the 1790s strongly promoted the banking system, and over heavy opposition from Jeffersonian Republicans, set up the First Bank of the United States. Jeffersonians allowed it to lapse, but the overwhelming financial difficulties of funding the War of 1812 without a central bank changed their minds. The Second Bank of the United States (1816–1836) under Nicholas Biddle functioned as a central bank, regulating the rapidly growing banking system. The role of a central bank was ended in the Bank War of the 1830s by President Andrew Jackson when he shut down the Second Bank as being too powerful and elitist.

In 1913 the United States created the Federal Reserve System through the passing of The Federal Reserve Act.

21st century
After the financial crisis of 2007–2008 central banks led change, but as of 2015 their ability to boost economic growth has stalled. Central banks debate whether they should experiment with new measures like negative interest rates or direct financing of government, "lean even more on politicians to do more". Andy Haldane from the Bank of England said "central bankers may need to accept that their good old days – of adjusting interest rates to boost employment or contain inflation – may be gone for good". The European Central Bank and the Bank of Japan whose economies are in or close to deflation, continue quantitative easing – buying securities to encourage more lending.

Since 2017, prospect of implementing Central Bank Digital Currency (CBDC) has been in discussion. As of the end of 2018, at least 15 central banks were considering to implementing CBDC. Since 2014, the People's Bank of China has been working on a project for digital currency to make its own digital currency and electronic payment systems.

Naming of central banks
There is no standard terminology for the name of a central bank, but many countries use the "Bank of [Country]" form—for example: Bank of Canada, Bank of Mexico, Bank of Thailand. The United Kingdom does not follow this form as its central bank is the Bank of England (which, despite its name, is the central bank of the United Kingdom as a whole). The name's lack of representation of the entire United Kingdom ('Bank of Britain', for example) can be owed to the fact that its establishment occurred when the Kingdoms of England, Scotland and Ireland were separate entities (at least in name), and therefore pre-dates the merger of the Kingdoms of England and Scotland, the Kingdom of Ireland's absorption into the Union and the formation of the present-day United Kingdom.

The word "Reserve" is also often included, such as the Reserve Bank of India, Reserve Bank of Australia, Reserve Bank of New Zealand, the South African Reserve Bank, and Federal Reserve System (the U.S. central bank). Other central banks are known as monetary authorities such as the Saudi Arabian Monetary Authority, Hong Kong Monetary Authority, Monetary Authority of Singapore, Maldives Monetary Authority and Cayman Islands Monetary Authority. There is an instance where native language was used to name the central bank: in the Philippines the Filipino name Bangko Sentral ng Pilipinas is used even in English.

Some are styled "national" banks, such as the Swiss National Bank, National Bank of Poland and National Bank of Ukraine, although the term national bank is also used for private commercial banks in some countries such as National Bank of Pakistan. In other cases, central banks may incorporate the word "Central" (for example, European Central Bank, Central Bank of Ireland, Central Bank of Brazil, Central Bank of Paraguay). In some countries, particularly in formerly Communist ones, the term national bank may be used to indicate both the monetary authority and the leading banking entity, such as the Soviet Union's Gosbank (state bank). In rare cases, central banks are styled "state" banks such as the State Bank of Pakistan and State Bank of Vietnam.

Many countries have state-owned banks or other quasi-government entities that have entirely separate functions, such as financing imports and exports. In other countries, the term national bank may be used to indicate that the central bank's goals are broader than monetary stability, such as full employment, industrial development, or other goals. Some commercial banks have names suggestive of central banks, even if they are not: examples are the State Bank of India and Central Bank of India, National Bank of Greece, Banco do Brasil, Bank of China, Bank of Cyprus, or Bank of Ireland, as well as Deutsche Bank.

The chief executive of a central bank is usually known as the Governor, President or Chair.

Statistics

Collectively, central banks purchase less than 500 tonnes of gold each year, on average (out of an annual global production of 2,500-3,000 tonnes). In 2018, central banks collectively hold over 33,000 metric tons of the gold, about a fifth of all the gold ever mined, according to Bloomberg News.

In 2016, 75% of the world's central-bank assets were controlled by four centers in China, the United States, Japan and the eurozone. The central banks of Brazil, Switzerland, Saudi Arabia, the U.K., India and Russia, each account for an average of 2.5 percent. The remaining 107 central banks hold less than 13 percent. According to data compiled by Bloomberg News, the top 10 largest central banks owned $21.4 trillion in assets, a 10 percent increase from 2015.

See also

 List of central banks
 History of central banking in the United States
 Fractional-reserve banking
 Free banking
 Full-reserve banking
 Monetary authority

References

Further reading
 Acocella, N., Di Bartolomeo, G., and Hughes Hallett, A. [2012], "Central banks and economic policy after the crisis: what have we learned?", ch. 5 in: Baker, H. K. and Riddick, L. A. (eds.), Survey of International Finance, Oxford University Press.

External links
 List of central bank websites at the Bank for International Settlements
 International Journal of Central Banking
 "The Federal Reserve System: Purposes and Functions" – A publication of the U.S. Federal Reserve, describing its role in the macroeconomy
   – C E V Borio, Bank for International Settlements, Basel

 
Banks
Banking terms